The 2012–2013 season was Zamalek Sporting Club's 102nd season of football and 57th consecutive season in the Egyptian Premier League. The club also played in the CAF Champions League.

Team kit

The 2012-2013 home kit was the classic Zamalek home kit, which featured golden trims and two parallel horizontal red lines. The away kit was all pink with grey trims, and grey shorts.

Squad

Egyptian Football Association (EFA) rules are that a team may only have 3 foreign born players in the squad. 
The Squad Has 25 Players Registered as Professionals and 5 Players Registered (-U23) and 2 Players of the Youth academy

Out on loan

Friendlies

Pre-season friendlies

Match World Cup 2013

Mid-season friendlies

Egyptian Premier League

Group 2

Results by round

Results summary

Matches

Note: The rest of the tournament was Cancelled due to 2013 Egyptian coup d'état.

Egypt Cup 

Note: The rest of the tournament was held during the following season due to 2013 Egyptian coup d'état.

CAF Champions League

Preliminary round

Zamalek won 7–0 on aggregate and advanced to the first round.

First round

Zamalek won 1–0 on aggregate and advanced to the second round.

Second round

Zamalek advanced to the group stage.

Notes

References

Zamalek SC seasons
Zamalek